A list of books and essays about Charlie Chaplin:

Chaplin, Charlie
Charlie Chaplin